Luciani is an Italian surname. Notable people with the surname include:

Albino Luciani (1912–1978), Italian pope of the Catholic Church (John Paul I)
Alessio Luciani (born 1990), Italian footballer
Clara Luciani (born 1992), French musician
Dante Luciani (born 1985), Canadian football wide receiver
Franco Luciani (born 1981), Argentinian musician and composer
Giacomo Luciani, Italian expert on the geopolitics of energy
Lucila Luciani de Pérez Díaz (1882–1971), Venezuelan historian, musician and feminist
Luigi Luciani (1842–1919), Italian neuroscientist
Luigi Luciani (footballer) (born 1996), Italian football player
Nicoletta Luciani (born 1979), Italian professional volleyball player
Sebastiano Luciani (c. 1485–1547), Italian Renaissance-Mannerist painter, better known as Sebastiano del Piombo

Italian-language surnames
Patronymic surnames